Canada sent a delegation to compete at the 2008 Summer Paralympics in Beijing. 143 Canadian athletes competed in 17 sports. Canada also sent several officials to the games, including Tara Grieve in boccia and Andrew Smith in rowing. Canada finished seventh on the medal table at the Beijing games after finishing third on the medal table at the 2004 Summer Paralympics (behind China and Great Britain). Swimmer Donovan Tildesley, a world record-holder and medalist at the 2000 and 2004 Paralympics, was the country's flag bearer at the opening ceremony. The delegation is headed by Chef de Mission Debbie Low.

Chantal Petitclerc ties the 5 gold medal record at a single Games for a Canadian, repeating the feat she performed at the 2004 Summer Paralympics, and tying Stephanie Dixon, who set the record at the 2000 Summer Paralympics.

Medalists

Sports

Archery

Men

|-
|align=left|Kevin Evans
|align=left|Men's individual compound open
|675
|9
|Bye
|W 110-109
|L 110-111
|colspan=3|Did not advance
|-
|align=left|Norbert Murphy
|align=left|Men's individual compound W1
|627
|5
|W 98-75
|L 97-111
|colspan=4|Did not advance
|}

Women

|-
|align=left|Lyne Tremblay
|align=left|Women's individual recurve W1/W2
|317
|20
|L 49-84
|colspan=5|Did not advance
|}

Athletics

Men's track

Men's field

Women's track

Women's field

Boccia

Cycling

Men's road

Men's track

Women's road

Women's track

Equestrian

Individual events

Team

* - denotes score is counted towards the total team's score.

Goalball

The men's and women's teams didn't win any medals; the men's team were knocked out by Lithuania in the quarter finals and the women's team didn't succeed to the semifinals.

Men's tournament
Players
Mario Caron
Jeff Christy
Rob Christy
Bruno Hache
Dean Kozak

Group B matches

Quarterfinals

5-8th classification

5/6th classification

Women's tournament
Players
Amy Alsop
Amy Kneebone
Annette Lisabeth
Nancy Morin
Shawna Ryan
Contessa Scott

Preliminary matches

Judo

Men

Rowing

Sailing

Shooting

Men

Women

Swimming

Men

Women

Table tennis

Men

Wheelchair basketball

The Canadian men's team won a silver medal after being defeated by Australia in the silver medal match while the women's team finished in fifth place overall.

Men's tournament
Players
Patrick Anderson
Jaimie Borisoff
Abditatch Dini
David Durepos
David Eng
Robert Hedges
Joey Johnson
Adam Lancia
Ross Norton
Richard Peter
Yvon Rouillard
Chris Stoutenberg

Group A Results

 

 

 

 

Quarterfinals

Semifinals  

Gold medal game

Women's tournament
Players
Chantal Benoit
Tracey Ferguson
Tara Feser
Lisa Franks
Katie Harnock
Jennifer Krempien
Janet McLachlan
Kendra Ohama
Cindy Ouellet
Sabrina Pettinicchi
Lori Radke
Misty Thomas

Group B Results

 

Quarterfinals  

Classification 5-8

Fifth place

Wheelchair fencing

Men

Wheelchair rugby

The Canadian rugby team won the bronze medal after narrowly defeating Great Britain in the bronze medal match.

Wheelchair tennis

Men

Women

Quads

See also
2008 Summer Paralympics
Canada at the 2008 Summer Olympics

References

External links
Beijing 2008 Paralympic Games Official Site
International Paralympic Committee
Full list of Canadian athletes at the Beijing Paralympics (Canadian Paralympic Committee website)

Nations at the 2008 Summer Paralympics
2008
Paralympics